= Kapar (dwelling) =

Temporary dwelling

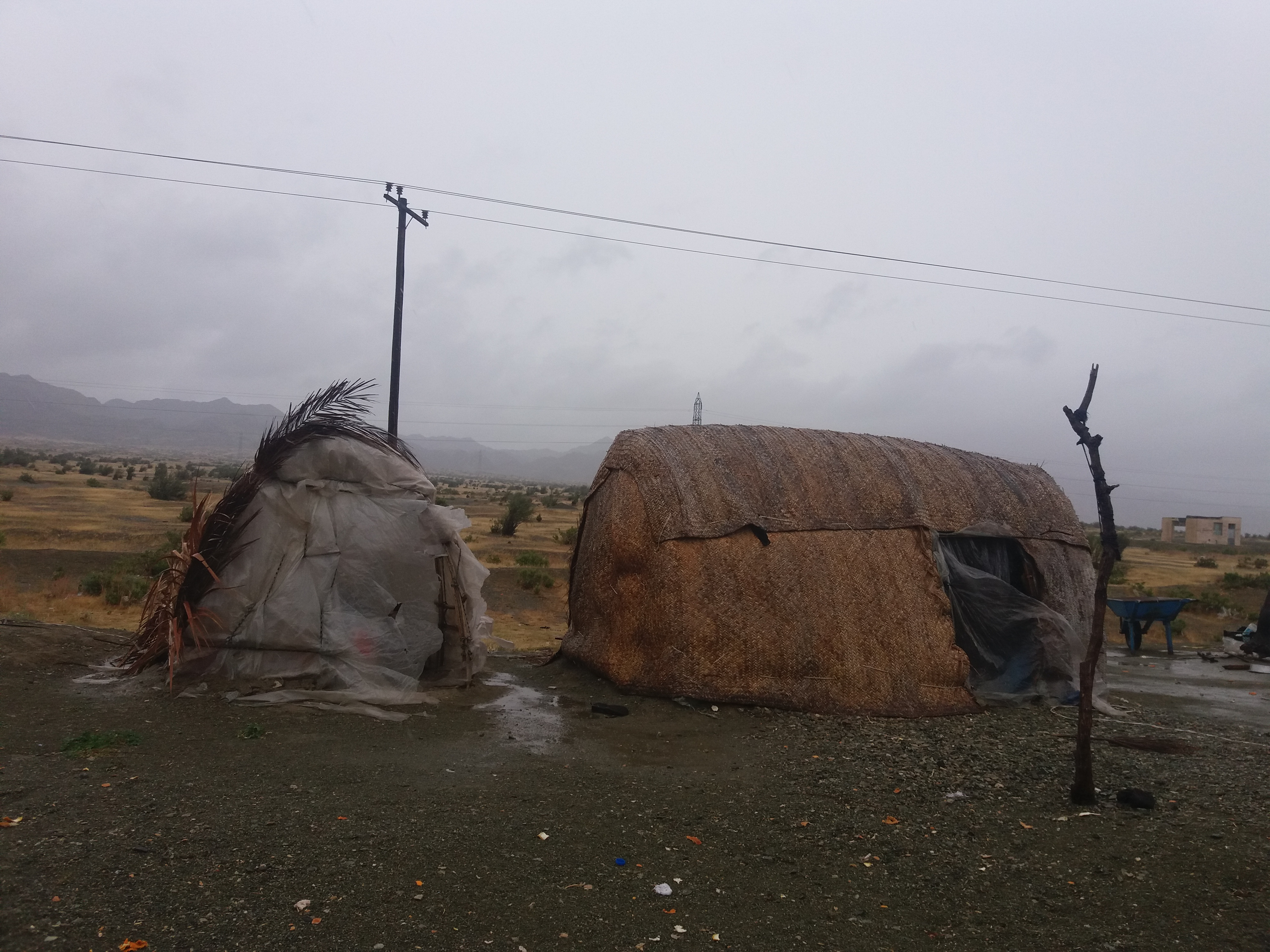
A Kapar near Bandar Abbas, Southern Iran.

Kapar (Persian: کپر) is a type of traditional temporary dwelling in southeastern Iran and the Baluchi-inhabited areas of Pakistan and Afghanistan.

A shelter of long frames, Kapar is often made of tamarisk and palm trees.
